Kingston Township may refer to:

Canada 
 Kingston Township, Ontario, now part of the city of Kingston, Ontario

United States 
 Kingston Township, DeKalb County, Illinois
 Kingston Township, Michigan
 Kingston Township, Meeker County, Minnesota
 Kingston Township, Caldwell County, Missouri
 Kingston Township, Washington County, Missouri
 Kingston Township, Sargent County, North Dakota, in Sargent County, North Dakota
 Kingston Township, Delaware County, Ohio
 Kingston Township, Luzerne County, Pennsylvania

Township name disambiguation pages